Gardini is a surname. Notable people with this surname include:

Andrea Gardini (born 1965), Italian volleyball player
Carlos Gardini (1948–2017), Argentine translator and science fiction and fantasy writer
Davide Gardini (born 1999), Italian volleyball player 
Elisabetta Gardini (born 1956), Italian actress and politician 
Fausto Gardini (1930–2008), Italian tennis player
Laura Gardini (born 1952), Italian mathematician
Maria Pia Gardini (1936–2012), Italian entrepreneur and former Scientologist
Raul Gardini (1933–1993), Italian businessman
Renato Gardini (1889–1940), Italian wrestler

See also 
 Gard (disambiguation)
 Cardini

Italian-language surnames